Unity for the Isles (UIB) was a Spanish party alliance formed by PSM–Nationalist Agreement (PSM–EN), Majorcan Union (UM), Republican Left of Catalonia (ERC), Agreement for Majorca (ExM) and The Greens of Menorca (EV–Me) to contest the 2008 general election in the Balearic Islands.

United Left had tried to re-edit the Progressives for the Balearic Islands coalition which had contested the 2004 general election, but the PSM–EN choose instead to form an alliance with UM, ERC and ExM, which had announced their will to field a joint list of candidates.

Composition

References

Defunct political party alliances in Spain
Political parties in the Balearic Islands